Ambakoke is a rural commune in Madagascar. It belongs to the district of Nosy Varika, which is a part of the region Vatovavy. The population of the commune was 4,999 in 2018.

References 

Populated places in Vatovavy